Bertha Elizabeth Stringer Lee (1869-1937) was an American painter, known for her California landscapes painted within the California Impressionist style.

Biography
Bertha Elizabeth Lee (née Stringer) was born on December 6, 1869, in San Francisco. She graduated from the University of California, Berkeley and went on to study painting with Amédée Joullin, William Keith, Arthur Frank Mathews, and Raymond Yelland.

She married Eugene Lee in 1894. The couple lived in San Francisco and Lee primarily painted California scenes.

She  exhibited her work at the Woman's Building at the 1893 World's Columbian Exposition in Chicago, Illinois. She also exhibited at the California State Fair, the Alaska–Yukon–Pacific Exposition, and the Mark Hopkins Institute. In 1922 she had a one-woman show at Richelieu Gallery in San Francisco.

Lee died on March 19, 1937, in Palo Alto, California.

References

External links

1869 births
1937 deaths
19th-century American women artists
20th-century American women artists
Artists from San Francisco
University of California, Berkeley alumni
19th-century American painters
20th-century American painters
Painters from California
American women painters